Getinghonung (English: Wasp's honey) is a 1974 album by Dutch-Swedish singer-songwriter Cornelis Vreeswijk.

Track listing
Music and lyrics by Cornelis Vreeswijk unless otherwise noted.
"Jag och Bosse Lidén" (Me and Bobby McGee, Kris Kristofferson/C. Vreeswijk) – 3:55
"Shåwinistblues" – 2:35
"Getinghonung à la Flamande" (trad./C. Vreeswijk) – 4:10
"Kalle Holm" (The ballad of Hollis Brown, Dylan/Vreeswijk) – 3:00
"Polaren Per hos det sociala" – 3:35
"Vårvisa" (Monica Zetterlund/Gerrit den Braber) – 3:50
"Lill-Klas' elektriska bas" (Clyde, J. J. Cale/C. Vreeswijk) – 2:40
"Getinghonung à la Berzelii" – 4:25
"Po Rom Pom Po'n" (Juan Solano/C. Vreeswijk) – 3:50
"Den falska flickan" – 2:45
"Getinghonung Provençale" – 4:35
"Droskblues" (J. J. Cale/C. Vreeswijk) – 3:00

Personnel
Cornelis Vreeswijk — vocal, guitar
Rune Gustafsson — guitar
Sture Åkerberg — bass
Janne Schaffer — guitar
Knud Jörgensen — piano, conga
Johan Dielemans — drums, tambourin, bonga
Monica Zetterlund — vocal
Jan Allan — trumpet
Björn Ståbi — violin
Ole Hjorth — violin
Göte Wilhelmson — accordion

References

Cornelis Vreeswijk albums
1974 albums